The Central California Women’s Conference (CCWC) is an annual one-day conference serving women of all generations, ethnicities and backgrounds in Fresno, California. 

The conference serves as a forum for women of all generations and backgrounds to share practical ideas on how to succeed in their careers while juggling the demands of life. Traditionally the conference attracts a sold-out crowd of 3,500 women. The conference is held annually in mid-September and includes a luncheon keynote speaker, twenty-seven sessions, and a tradeshow with about 175 vendors. The conference empowers women in all stages of their lives.

History
The late State Senator Ken Maddy founded the Central California Women’s Conference in 1988. This conference was designed with the plans to educate, motivate and inspire women so they can excel in their professional and personal lives.

Topics for the conference address issues relevant to women and are led by national, regional and local experts. 

The conference draws a crowd of 3,500 or more women and is one of the largest women’s conferences in the state of California.

Keynote Speakers
Each year the conference hosts a luncheon with a keynote speaker. The first speaker was Rita Moreno in 1988. 
 2019 - Tyra Banks
 2018 - Maria Shriver
2017 - Amy Purdy
2016 - Lisa Ling
2015 - Leeza Gibbons
2014 - Valerie Bertinelli
2013 -Helen Hunt
 2012 –Jamie Lee Curtis 
 2011 –Geena Davis  
 2010 – Marie Osmond 
 2009 – Robin Roberts (newscaster)  
 2008 – Suze Orman 
 2007 – Goldie Hawn 
 2006 – Nancy Brinker  
 2005 – Joan Lunden  
 2004 – Star Jones 
 2003 – Erin Brockovich 
 2002 – Peggy Fleming 
 2001 – Cokie Roberts 
 2000 – Marcia Wallace 
 1999 – Suzie Orman 
 1998 – The Honorable Ann Richards 
 1997 – Paula Zahn 
 1996 – Vicki Lawrence  
 1995 – Lynn Sherr 
 1994 – Nancy Snyderman 
 1993 – Jehan Sadat 
 1992 – Gail Sheehy 
 1991 – Debbie Reynolds 
 1990 – Sherry Lansing 
 1989 – Wilma Rudolph 
 1988 – Rita Moreno

Giving Back

CCWC is a 501(c)3 nonprofit and has donated more than one-half a million dollars to charities that are for the support of women and children. Past donations have gone to support causes such as emergency and homeless shelters, domestic violence and sexual assault, treatment and prevention, parenting classes and family counseling. 
Previous recipients include Encourage Tomorrow, Evangel Home, Inc., Family Services of Tulare County-Rape Crisis, Focus Forward, Holy Cross Center for Women, Majaree Mason Center, Naomi’s House, Parent Resource Center, Pregnancy Care Center, Samaritan Women and Sisterhood of Survivors.

References
 Central California Women's Conference: ccwc-fresno.org
 Facebook: facebook.com/CCWC.Fresno/info
 Women's Conference Portfolio: ccwcfresno.wordpress.com

Women in California
Women's conferences